Naatan Skyttä (born 7 May 2002) is a Finnish professional footballer who plays as a midfielder for Danish Superliga club OB, on loan from Toulouse.

Club career

On 26 August 2022, he joined Norwegian Eliteserien club Viking on loan for the remainder of the 2022 season.

Career statistics

Honours
Toulouse

 Ligue 2: 2021–22

Individual
Veikkausliiga Team of the Year: 2020

References

External links
 

2002 births
Living people
Finnish footballers
Finnish expatriate footballers
Finland under-21 international footballers
Finland youth international footballers
Association football midfielders
Sportspeople from Pirkanmaa
People from Ylöjärvi
FC Ilves players
Toulouse FC players
Viking FK players
Odense Boldklub players
Veikkausliiga players
Ligue 1 players
Ligue 2 players
Eliteserien players
Danish Superliga players
Finnish expatriate sportspeople in France
Finnish expatriate sportspeople in Norway
Finnish expatriate sportspeople in Denmark
Expatriate footballers in France
Expatriate footballers in Norway
Expatriate footballers in Denmark